Panlong Road is a station on Line 17 of the Shanghai Metro. It opened with the rest of Line 17 on 30 December 2017.

History 
The station opened for passenger trial operation on 30 December 2017, concurrent with the opening of the rest of Line 17.

Description 

The station is located at the intersection of Songze Avenue and Panlong Road, in the Qingpu District of Shanghai. An underground station, the station consists of three floors. From street level, passengers descend a concourse level with fare gates, ticket machines, and a customer service counter. The platforms are located one level beneath the concourse level. Toilets are available at the east end of the platform, within the fare-paid zone.

Like all stations on Line 17, the station is fully accessible. An elevator connects the street level to the concourse level near Exit 3. Within the fare-paid zone, an elevator connects the concourse level to the platform level.

Exits 
There are three exits of the station:
 Exit 1: Songze Avenue, Panlong Road
 Exit 2: Panlong Road
 Exit 3: Panhe Road

References 

Railway stations in Shanghai
Shanghai Metro stations in Qingpu District
Railway stations in China opened in 2017
Line 17, Shanghai Metro